Several ships of the Prussian and Austrian/Austro-Hungarian Navies have been named SMS Drache (Dragon)

, an ironclad warship of the Austrian Navy
, a steam gunboat of the Prussian Navy

Austro-Hungarian Navy ship names